Delta Force Commando, is a 1987 Italian "macaroni combat" war film directed by Pierluigi Ciriaci as Frank Valenti and starring Fred Williamson and Bo Svenson.

Plot
An American pilot and a member of the "Delta Force" set off in pursuit of a terrorist group in possession of a tactical nuclear weapon.

Cast
Brett Baxter Clark as Lt. Tony Turner
Fred Williamson as Capt. Samuel Beck
Bo Svenson as Col. Keitel
Mark Gregory 
Divana Brandão as Maria 
Mario Novelli  
Emy Valentino
Jean Michel Pellizza

Release and reception
Delta Force Commando was released by Vista on home video in the United States on  November 25, 1987.

On the original home video release, The Capital Times summarized that the "acting is terrible but there are a number of dazzling action scenes." In the German Film almanach Fischer film almanach, the reviewer found that the film was a "primitive war film" with dubious politics.

See also 
 List of Italian films of 1987
 Euro War
 War film

References

External links

1987 films
1980s war films
English-language Italian films
Macaroni Combat films
Vietnam War films
1980s English-language films
1980s Italian films